The Samsung SGH-A657 is a "rugged" Samsung bar phone for AT&T.  The phone has various features, including resistance to dust, shock, vibration, moisture, and falls.  Push To Talk (PTT) is also supported, along with a small LED flashlight and a task manager button.  

Featured prominently, with its own keypad button, AT&T's pre-installed Navigator GPS program.  MP3 and web browsing capability are also included on the approximately 4 ounce device.

References

Mobile telecommunications standards
Samsung mobile phones
Mobile phones introduced in 2009